Lepidomys irrenosa is a species of snout moth in the genus Lepidomys. It was described by Achille Guenée in 1852 and is known from the United States, including Florida, Georgia and South Carolina. It is also found on Cuba.

References

Moths described in 1852
Chrysauginae